Ronald Branton (born 10 June 1933) is a former Australian rules football player who played in the VFL between 1953 and 1962 for the Richmond Football Club.

Branton played with Myrtleford in the Ovens & Murray Football League from 1963 to 1965 as their captain/coach, kicking 80 goals during that time.

Branton then played two seasons with KIng Valley Football Club in the Ovens & King Football League in 1966 and 1967, kicking 49 goals during that time.

References

External links
 
 
 Richmond Football Club - Hall of Fame
 Oral History - Ron Branton

Living people
Richmond Football Club players
Jack Dyer Medal winners
Myrtleford Football Club players
Maryborough Football Club players
Australian rules footballers from Victoria (Australia)
1933 births